Philentoma is an enigmatic genus of birds. They are now usually included in the Vangidae.

Species
There are two species:

References

 Del Hoyo, J.; Elliot, A. & Christie D. (editors). (2006). Handbook of the Birds of the World. Volume 11: Old World Flycatchers to Old World Warblers. Lynx Edicions. .

 
Old World flycatchers
Bird genera
Birds described in 1845
Taxonomy articles created by Polbot
Taxa named by Thomas Campbell Eyton